Laurelwood Cemetery is a historic cemetery located at Rock Hill, South Carolina.  It was established in 1872, and was the first municipal cemetery of Rock Hill. It contains over 11,414 marked grave sites and includes variety of funerary art including a few raised stone tombs and a number of obelisks, table markers, spheres, and other forms. The cemetery also includes a Confederate monument and a memorial to veterans of the World War I.

It was listed on the National Register of Historic Places in 2008.

References

External links
 

Cemeteries on the National Register of Historic Places in South Carolina
1872 establishments in South Carolina
Buildings and structures in Rock Hill, South Carolina
National Register of Historic Places in Rock Hill, South Carolina